Idiothele is a genus of African tarantulas that was first described by J. Hewitt in 1919.  it contains two species, both found in southern Africa: I. mira and I. nigrofulva.

See also
 List of Theraphosidae species

References

Theraphosidae genera
Spiders of Africa
Theraphosidae